Monção is a municipality in the district of Viana do Castelo in Portugal. The population in 2011 was 19,230, in an area of 211.31 km2.
The current Mayor is the Social Democrat António Barbosa. The municipal holiday is March 12.

Climate

Monção has a Hot-summer Mediterranean climate (Köppen: Csa) with mild, rainy winters and hot dry summers, although short, the dry season is dry enough to avoid being classified has a humid subtropical climate or an oceanic climate like nearby Vigo.

Notable people
 Joaquim Pereira Pimenta de Castro (1846 in Pias, Monção – 1918) an army officer and politician; 10th Count of Pimenta de Castro
 José Gomes Temporão (born 1951) a Brazilian public health physician and Minister of Health of Brazil, 2007 to 2010.
 Fernando Vilar (born 1954 in Lara, Monção) a Uruguayan journalist and news anchor.

Population

Parishes
Administratively, the municipality is divided into 24 civil parishes (freguesias):

 Abedim
 Anhões e Luzio
 Barbeita
 Barroças e Taias
 Bela
 Cambeses 
 Ceivães e Badim
 Lara 
 Longos Vales
 Mazedo e Cortes 
 Merufe
 Messegães, Valadares e Sá 
 Monção e Troviscoso
 Moreira 
 Pias 
 Pinheiros 
 Podame
 Portela 
 Riba de Mouro
 Sago, Lordelo e Parada 
 Segude
 Tangil
 Troporiz e Lapela
 Trute

See also
Vinho Verde
Brejoeira Palace
Mercy Charitys's Church of Valadares
Longos Vales's Monastery
Castelo de Monção

References

External links
Municipality official website
Quinta de Santo Antonio